

First Bulgarian Empire

Second Bulgarian Empire

Third Bulgarian State

Gallery

Bulgaria
Bulgaria, Royal Consorts of